Royal Academy (21 February 1987 – 22 February 2012) was an American-bred, Irish-trained Thoroughbred racehorse. Bought by trainer Vincent O'Brien at the 1988 Keeneland Sales for $3.5 million, the colt was best known as the winner of the 1990 Breeders' Cup Mile in which famed British jockey Lester Piggott came out of retirement to ride him. Royal Academy also won the 1990 July Cup at Newmarket. He was a son of the great racehorse and sire Nijinsky, whom he resembled in conformation and temperament.

In 1991 Royal Academy was retired to stud at Coolmore Stud's American arm, Ashford Stud in Versailles, Kentucky. He was later transferred to Coolmore's Australian stud. A successful sire, among others he sired 2001 Breeders' Cup Mile winner Val Royal, Bullish Luck who in 2006 was voted Hong Kong Horse of the Year and had career earnings of $6,435,501, and Bel Esprit, the sire of Black Caviar who was rated the best sprinter in the world in 2010, 2011, 2012 and 2013. He sired a British Classic winner in the filly Sleepytime, who won the 1000 Guineas in 1997. Royal Academy was also damsire of the Australian champion sire, Fastnet Rock.

Royal Academy was retired from stud duty in 2010 and died of old age on 22 February 2012 at the Coolmore Stud in Australia.

References

 Royal Academy's pedigree and racing stats
 Royal Academy at the Thoroughbred Times stallion directory

1987 racehorse births
2012 racehorse deaths
Racehorses bred in Kentucky
Racehorses trained in Ireland
Breeders' Cup Mile winners
Thoroughbred family 8-c
Chefs-de-Race